Louis Korn was an American architect from New York City who graduated from Columbia University in 1891. His notable buildings include 9-11 East 16th Street and 91-93 Fifth Avenue, both located in the Ladies' Mile Historic District, and 174-178 Hudson Street which is located in the Tribeca North Historic District. He is known to have specialized in store and loft buildings.

Notable New York City buildings
7 Great Jones Street
9-11 East 16th Street
34-42 West 14th Street
91-93 Fifth Avenue
141-145 Wooster Street
174-178 Hudson Street
627-629 Broadway
736 Broadway

References 

Architects from New York City
Columbia University alumni
19th-century American architects
20th-century American architects